Jake O’Kane (born 12 March 1961) is a Belfast-based stand-up comedian, and a resident compère of the Northern Ireland comedy club, "The Empire Laughs Back" at The Empire Music Hall in Belfast.

O'Kane has toured on the comedy circuit, and has also appeared at clubs including The Stand, Jongleurs and The Comedy Store.

He hosted and performed on the BBC Northern Ireland stand up television show One Night Stand, and was a resident panellist on the show The Blame Game on both TV and radio from 2005 to 2021.

In addition to his comedy, O'Kane also runs an off licence shop in North Belfast.

Personal life 
O'Kane lives in North Belfast with his wife and 2 children. He was a champion power-lifter in his youth. O'Kane suffers from coeliac disease and is teetotal. His father, Jim O'Kane, was a Republican Labour councillor on Belfast City Council and was interned in 1971 as part of Operation Demetrius.

Filmography

References

External links

Living people
Male comedians from Northern Ireland
Male actors from Northern Ireland
Stand-up comedians from Northern Ireland
Satirists from Northern Ireland
Comedians from Belfast
1961 births